The 1975 Pacific Coast Open, also known by its sponsored name Fireman's Fund International, was a men's tennis tournament played on indoor hard courts (Supreme Court) at the Cow Palace in San Francisco, California in the United States. The event was part of the Grade AA category of the 1975 Grand Prix circuit. It was the 87th edition of the tournament and ran from September 22 through September 28, 1975. Arthur Ashe won the singles title and $16,000 first prize money. The total attendance for the tournament was 55,000.

Finals

Singles
 Arthur Ashe defeated  Guillermo Vilas 6–0, 7–6(7–4)

Doubles
 Fred McNair /  Sherwood Stewart defeated  Allan Stone /  Kim Warwick 6–2, 7–6(7–3)

References

External links
 ITF tournament edition details

Pacific Coast International Open
1975 World Championship Tennis circuit
Pacific Coast International Open
Pacific Coast International Open
Pacific Coast International Open
Pacific Coast International Open